Thomas Woodward may refer to:

 Thomas Woodward (theologian) (1814–1875), Irish theologian
 Thomas Bullene Woodward (active since 1973), American Episcopal minister
 Thomas E. Woodward (active since 1988), Christian apologist
 Tom Jones (born Thomas John Woodward), Welsh singer
 Thomas Morgan Woodward (1925–2019), American actor
 Thomas Jenkinson Woodward (1745–1820), English botanist
 Thomas Simpson Woodward (1797-1859), United States Army general
 Thomas B. Woodward, Secretary of State of Mississippi
 Thomas Woodward (footballer) (1900–1981), Welsh footballer